Dr. hab. Piotr Zawojski  (born 1963) is a Polish media expert. He is a tenured professor in the Department of Film and Media Studies at the University of Silesia in Katowice, Poland.

Biography

Teaching career
Zawojski works in the fields of film, photography, new media and the area of cyberculture. He teaches history and theory of film and television, communication, digital photography, new media and cyberculture. Professor Zawojski is a guest lecturer at the Academy of Fine Artsin Cracow and at the Jagiellonian University  in Cracow, one of the oldest universities in the world. He also frequently offers courses at the Krzysztof Kieślowski Radio and Television Faculty at the University of Silesia.

Educational programs
Zawojski has been heavily involved in youth and adult educational programs including Festiwal Filmów Kultowych (Cult Film Festival) in Katowice. He has supported several film festivals in Central Europe, promoting independent filmmakers. He also serves as an artistic director of digital_ia, an annual digital art festival in Poland.

Publications
Zawojski is the author of Elektroniczane obrazoświaty. Między sztuką a technologią (Electronic Imageworlds. Between Art and Technology) (2000), Wielkie filmy przełomu wieków. Subiektywny przewodnik (Great Films at the Centuries Turn. A Subjective Guidebook) (2007) as well as Cyberkultura. Syntopia sztuki, nauki i technologii (Cyberculture. Syntopy of art, science and technology) (2010) and Sztuka obrazu i obrazowania w epoce nowych mediów (Art of Image and Imaging in the Era of New Media) (2012).  He co-edited Wiek ekranów. Przestrzenie kultury widzenia/ A Century of Screen. Physical spaces associated with the Viewing Culture  (2002), science editor and the introduction author of Für eine Philosophie der Fotografie (Towards a Philosophy of Photography) by Vilém Flusser (2004), an editor of Digitalne dotknięcia. Teoria w praktyce/Praktyka w teorii (Digital Touch. A Theory in Practice/A Practice in Theory) (2010).

Professor Zawojski has published numerous works for leading Central European professional and academic journals: Studia Filmoznawcze (Film Studies), Kwartalnik Filmowy (Film Quarterly) of the Institute of Art of the Polish Academy of Sciences, Sztuka i Filozofia (Art and Philosophy), Postscriptum, National Center for Culture quarterly Kultura Współczesna, Polish Academy of Sciences Annual Rocznik Historii Sztuki, Przegląd Kulturoznawczy, Format, Zeszyty Telewizyjne (Television Academy), Zeszyty Artystyczne, Art Inquiry. Additionally he has co-authored numerous academic papers. Zawojski is an expert in academic critique of modern film and of audio-visual culture, photography and cyberculture. He is a head editor for Opcje magazine and a frequent contributor to popular regional publications Ekran, Kino, artPapier, Świat Obrazu. He is also a member of the program board of magazine CyberEmpathy – Visual and Media Studies Academic Journal. Piotr Zawojski created and edited policy for television programming, viewing as well as monitoring analysis for the terrestrial national television carrier TVP. He was also regularly published in the Polish television industry publication.

Awards
Zawojski has received numerous local and national awards and has been invited to over 50 national and international conferences. He is a member of the International Association for Aesthetics and International Association of Art Critics (AICA).

See also

 Analog photography
 Cinema of Poland
 Digital versus film photography
 History of cinema
 List of famous Poles
 List of film festivals
 List of film formats
 List of film techniques
 List of motion picture-related topics (Extensive alphabetical listing and glossary).
 List of photographic processes
 List of video-related topics
 National Film School in Łódź
 New York Polish Film Festival
 Outline of film
 Polish film school
 Seattle Polish Film Festival

References
Cyberkultura: syntopia sztuki, nauki i technologii
Wielkie filmy przełomu wieków: subiektywny przewodnik
Sztuka obrazu i obrazowania w epoce nowych mediow
Wiek ekranów : przestrzenie kultury widzenia

External links 
 Piotr Zawojski's website

1963 births
Living people
Film theorists
Polish film historians